Alexander Kharlampieyevich Zaveryukha (30 April 1940 — 21 March 2015) was a Russian politician of the late Soviet Union and the early years of the Russian Federation, serving under President Boris Yeltsin. He served as a Deputy Chairman of the Government of the Russian Federation for the agricultural industry in Viktor Chernomyrdin's first and second cabinets. Zaveryukha was also the leader of the Agrarian Party of Russia.

Early life
Born in 1940, he worked as a tractor driver and later was a tank commander in the Soviet Army, from 1959 to 1962. He then graduated from an agricultural institute and held various positions in the Orenburg Oblast agricultural industry.

Career in politics
After the fall of the USSR, Zaveryukha was one of the leading members of the new Agrarian Party of Russia, a rural ally of the Communist Party of the Russian Federation. In 1993 he was elected to the State Duma on the Agrarian ticket.

On February 10, 1993, a presidential decree appointed Alexander Zaveryukha to deputy prime minister for agriculture. In early 1994 Zaveryukha's proposal for agricultural subsidies to help aid the ailing former Soviet collectivized farms was approved. From January to May 1996, he also served as acting Minister of Agriculture. One of his opponents was finance minister and deputy prime minister Boris Fyodorov, who resigned in January 1994 after Zaveryukha and Viktor Gerashchenko were not fired at his request. On March 17, 1997, he was removed from his post as deputy prime minister.

Sources

References

Books
 
 

1940 births
2015 deaths
People from Orenburg Oblast
Communist Party of the Soviet Union members
Agrarian Party of Russia politicians
Deputy heads of government of the Russian Federation
Agriculture ministers of Russia
First convocation members of the State Duma (Russian Federation)
Second convocation members of the State Duma (Russian Federation)
Russian agriculturalists
Soviet military personnel
Recipients of the Order "For Merit to the Fatherland", 4th class